This list shows the spending on education of various countries as a percentage of total government expenditure. It is based on data from the UNESCO Institute for Statistics.

The UNESCO dataset does not specify whether education capital expenditures are included, or whether only recurrent expenditures were considered.

List

References 

Government budgets
Spending
Education Spending as % of government expenditure